Celina Haider (born 20 July 2000) is a German ice hockey player and member of the German national team, currently playing in the German Women's Ice Hockey League (DFEL) with ERC Ingolstadt.

She represented Germany at the IIHF Women's World Championship in 2019 and 2022.

References

External links

2000 births
Living people
German women's ice hockey forwards
People from Rosenheim
Sportspeople from Upper Bavaria